Syedna Feer-Khan Shujauddin  (died 9 Zil Qa'dah 1065 AH/1657 AD, Ahmedabad, India) was the 33rd Da'i al-Mutlaq (Absolute Missionary) of the Dawoodi Bohra sect of Musta‘lī Islam. He succeeded the 32nd Da'i Syedna Qutubuddin Shaheed to the religious post. He became Da'i al-Mutlaq in 1056 AH  (1648 AD), and his period of Dawat was from 1056-1065 AH (1648-1657 AD).

Family
His father's name was Malak Shah. He married at the age of 17.

Life
Syedna Feer-Khan harbored great interest in acquiring knowledge from an early age. He used to attend discourses conducted by the 28th Da'i Syedna Sheikh-Adam Safiuddin. 

He was imprisoned in Aurangabad by the Mughal Emperor Aurangzeb. Thereafter, he was shifted to Lahore and placed in a stable, which on the following night happened to catch fire and was totally destroyed except the dungeon, wherein Syedna was kept. He was found safe in the morning. All people held that the conflagration was due to his captivity. By an imperial order Aurangzeb was compelled to set Syedna at liberty and grant him a safe and honourable return to Ahmedabad in 1647.

It was during Syedna Feer-Khan Shujauddin's tenure that a dissident sect called Hujumiya was formed, led by Ahmed bin Fateh Muhammad, Yusuf bin Chand-ji and Chand Miya Abu-Ji. In 1654, Murad Bakhsh was appointed governor of Gujarat. He arrested Syedna Feer-Khan at the instigation of Ahmed. Syedna Feer-Khan was freed shortly afterwards.

Death
Syedna Feer-Khan Shujauddin died on 9th Zil-Qa'dah 1065 AH (1657 AD) as a result of abdominal pain.

References

Year of birth unknown
1657 deaths
Scholars from Ahmedabad
Dawoodi Bohra da'is
17th-century Ismailis